Francisco "Paco" Román y Velasquez (October 4, 1869 – June 5, 1899) was a Spanish Filipino soldier and later became a revolutionary during Philippine Revolution and Philippine–American War. Roman had the rank of a colonel in the revolutionary army, and served as the close aide of General Antonio Luna. When Luna was assassinated in Cabanatuan, Nueva Ecija, Román  attempted to save him but he was also shot to death by Emilio Aguinaldo's presidential guards.

Personal life 
Francisco Román was born on October 4, 1869, in Alcala, Cagayan to Pelagia Velásquez, a Tagalog and José Román a Spanish national. Pelagia was the sister of Hilaria Velasquez, the mother of José and Rafael Palma. Paco's father, José, was a licensee of the tobacco monopoly system then implemented in the province. The family moved to Manila where the elder Román established a factory. Francisco then studied at Ateneo Municipal de Manila and eventually pursued studies in Hong Kong.

Roman married Juliana Piqueras, whom he had two children, Juan and Carmen.

Philippine independence struggle 
Francisco Román  assumed his father's business after the latter died and secretly donated to the revolutionary cause. Being the son of a Spanish national, he sided with the colonial government and was believed to have volunteered in the Spanish cavalry in order to not be suspected of aiding the revolutionary forces. At the outbreak of the Philippine–American War, Roman joined General Antonio Luna's forces and rose to the ranks to become a colonel and Luna's aide-de-camp.

Román led what came to be known as the Second Battle of Caloocan where his forces were able to push the invading American forces back to Azcárraga Street in Manila.

Assassination 
While setting up his mountain headquarters in Bayambang, Pangasinan, General Antonio Luna received a telegram on June 4, 1899, from Cabanatuan, Nueva Ecija summoning him to a conference with the President Emilio Aguinaldo. Román, together with Captain Eduardo Rusca, Majors Manuel Bernal, José Bernal, and Simeon Villa, and 25 cavalrymen, joined Luna to Cabanatuan.

The next day, en route to Cabanatuan, a broken bridge posed to delay the entire party. Luna, accompanied by only Román and Rusca, decided to proceed immediately to the parish convent which was used as Aguinaldo's office after moving the government's capital from Malolos.

At around three in the afternoon, Luna, Román, and Rusca arrived at the convent of Cabanatuan, with Luna proceeding to meet Aguinaldo. Upon hearing gunshots Román proceeded to come to Luna's aid, but was assassinated himself by Aguinaldo's personal guards from Kawit, Cavite.

Román was buried together with Luna at the town cemetery with military honors. However, the whereabouts of his body was lost, as Luna's was later exhumed and transferred. Aguinaldo denied any knowledge in the assassination of Luna and Román, but acknowledged his failure to persecute the people behind their deaths.

In popular culture
 Portrayed by Rogelio Aldo Yadao in the film, El Presidente (2012).
 Portrayed by Joem Bascon in the film, Heneral Luna (2015).

References

Further reading 
 

Filipino people of Spanish descent
People of the Philippine Revolution
People of the Philippine–American War
People from Cagayan
1869 births
1899 deaths
Ateneo de Manila University alumni